The Geometrid is the second studio album by Looper, released in 2000. It peaked at number 22 on the UK Independent Albums Chart.

Critical reception
Exclaim! called The Geometrid "a beautiful, modern pop record." The Guardian deemed it "a collection of shabbily produced electro-indie ditties hamstrung by half-hearted vocals and laughably leaden beats." The Cleveland Scene considered it "a fascinating blend of techno beats with the warmth and invitation of a purer and more populist brand of pop music."

Track listing

Charts

References

External links
 

2000 albums
Looper (band) albums
Jeepster Records albums
Sub Pop albums